The men's 1500 metres in short track speed skating at the 2002 Winter Olympics took place on 20 February at the Salt Lake Ice Center.

Records
Prior to this competition, the existing world and Olympic records were as follows:

The following new Olympic records were set during this competition.

Results

Heats
The first round was held on 20 February. There were six heats of five skaters each, with the top three finishers moving on to the semifinals.

Heat 1

Heat 2

Heat 3

Heat 4

Heat 5

Heat 6

Semifinals
The semifinals were held on 20 February. The top two finishers in each of the three semifinals qualified for the A final, while the third and fourth place skaters advanced to the B Final.

Semifinal 1

Semifinal 2

Semifinal 3

Finals
The six qualifying skaters competed in Final A, while six others raced in Final B.

Final A

Final B

Controversy
In the final race A, with one lap remaining and currently in second place, Apolo Ohno of the United States attempted to make a pass on the leader Kim Dong-Sung of South Korea, who then drifted to the inside and as a result, Ohno raised his arms to imply he was blocked. Kim finished first ahead of Ohno, but the Australian referee James Hewish disqualified Kim for what appeared to be impeding, awarding the gold medal to Ohno. Fourth-place finisher of the race, Fabio Carta of Italy, showed his disagreement with the disqualification decision saying it was "absurd that the Korean was disqualified". China's Li Jiajun, who moved from bronze to silver, remained neutral saying: "I respect the decision of the referee, I'm not going to say any more". Australian Steven Bradbury, the 1000 m gold-medal winner, also shared his views: "Whether Dong-Sung moved across enough to be called for cross-tracking, I don't know, he obviously moved across a bit. It's the judge's interpretation. A lot of people will say it was right and a lot of people will say it's wrong. I've seen moves like that before that were not called. But I've seen them called too".

The South Korean team immediately protested the decision of the chief official of the race, but their protests were denied by the International Skating Union (ISU). The South Korean team then appealed to the International Olympic Committee (IOC) and the Court of Arbitration for Sport (CAS). The IOC refused to see the case, stating, "This is a matter for the ISU to decide on. At this time, the IOC has received no proposal and taken no action". The CAS sided with the officials of the race as "there is no provision in the short-track rule book for overturning a judgment call by the referee" after the South Korean team asked to have a video replay be used to determine whether or not there was a rule violation.

The disqualification of Kim upset South Korean supporters, many of whom directed their anger at Ohno and the IOC. A large number of e-mails protesting the race results crashed the IOC's email server, and thousands of accusatory letters, many of which contained death threats, were sent to Ohno and the IOC. South Korean media accused Ohno of simulating foul, using the Konglish word "Hollywood action". Ohno shared his thoughts on the Koreans' hostile reaction by saying, "I was really bothered by it. I grew up around many Asian cultures, Korean one of them. A lot of my best friends were Korean growing up. I just didn't understand. Later on I realized that was built up by certain people and that was directed at me, negative energy from other things, not even resulting around the sport, but around politics, using me to stand on the pedestal as the anti-American sentiment". Earlier the same year, President George Bush had named North Korea as one of three members of the Axis of Evil, which had upset some South Koreans; directing their anger at Ohno was a less direct way of voicing anger against Bush's decision. The controversy continued at the 2002 FIFA World Cup, held jointly in South Korea and Japan several months after the Olympics. When the South Korean soccer team scored a goal during the group stage match against the U.S. team, South Korean players Ahn Jung-Hwan and Lee Chun-Soo made an exaggerated move imitating the move Ohno had made during the speed skating event to imply the other athlete had drifted into his lane.

References

 Epstein, Adam. Sports Law (The West Legal Studies Series): Volume 2002, Clifton Park, NY : Thomson/Delmar Learning, 2003. .

Men's short track speed skating at the 2002 Winter Olympics